Marske-by-the-Sea is a village in the unitary authority of Redcar and Cleveland and the ceremonial county of North Yorkshire, England.
It is located on the coast, between the seaside resorts of Redcar and Saltburn-by-the-Sea, although it is not itself a seaside resort.
Marske is in the civil parish of Saltburn, Marske and New Marske and comprises the wards of Longbeck (shared with New Marske) and St Germains.

History 

Marske is mentioned in the Domesday Book.
St Germain's Church was consecrated by bishop Ægelric between 1042 and 1056.
Marske was amerced 20 marks for its part in the pillaging of a Norwegian vessel in 1180.

RFC Marske 

The Royal Flying Corps had a landing strip and schools in Marske, based at Marske Aerodrome. 'Captain' W. E. Johns, the author of the Biggles books, was posted to RFC Marske during part of the First World War, from April until August 1918.

The Bristol M1C Monoplane, The Red Devil, was first flown from this RFC aerodrome.
The RAF later administered an airfield here.
After the Second World War the site of the aerodrome became an ICI depot and later a housing estate, The Landings, with roads named on an aeronautical theme: Avro Close, Blackburn Grove, De Havilland Drive – leading onto Vickers Lane–, Beardmore Avenue, Folland Drive, Wellington Close, Brabazon Drive, Halifax Close and Lysander Court.

Politics

Parish and district
Marske is part of the Saltburn, Marske and New Marske parish. The civil parish area was formerly Saltburn and Marske-by-the-Sea Urban District from 1932–1974. It was formed by the Marske part of Guisborough Rural District and Saltburn-by-the-Sea Urban District.

Wapentake and borough
The area was historically in the Langbaurgh Wapentake, also known as Cleveland. The village was part of a Cleveland namesake county under 1974 reforms until 1996 reforms. The 1974 reforms also placed the village under Langbaurgh borough, it was renamed Langbaurgh-on-Tees in 1988 and (since 1996) is named Redcar and Cleveland.

County and riding
The village's historic county is Yorkshire, in its North Riding. The North Riding County Council was established in 1889, the council was abolished in 1974.

Constituency
Marske is part of Redcar constituency and is represented by Conservative Jacob Young in the House of Commons.

Economy 

The majority of the residents of Marske do not work within the village, but work in nearby industry or in Middlesbrough or Redcar.
Marske has a range of local shops and a mixture of light industries on the Industrial Estate notably label and barcode specialists Weyfringe.
There is also small scale sea fishing using cobles and tractors from the beach.

Landmarks 

Marske has two imposing mansion houses.

 Marske Hall* was built around 1625 and was formerly the home of the Zetland family. It was gifted to Leonard Cheshire to be run as a home for the disabled in 1964 and continued as such for the following 55 years, until it was sold as a going concern to a private company in 2019.
 Cliff House,* which stands on the cliff tops overlooking the beach, was built in the 19th century as a holiday residence for the Pease family, who were prominent in the north-east business community, at the time, and principal shareholders in the Stockton and Darlington Railway. The railway was extended to Redcar in the 1840s and to Marske and Saltburn in the 1860s.
Marske has its own post office, medical centre, leisure centre and a library.
The village has Methodist, Baptist, Church of England and Roman Catholic churches and five public houses: The Frigate, The Ship Inn,* The Zetland, The Mermaid and The Clarendon.
The tower of St Germain's church was allowed to remain close to the cliff edge as a prominent landmark for fishermen in the North Sea.

Most of Marske's listed buildings are to be found on High Street,
and Redcar Road,
but there are a few more on Church Street,
Cliff Terrace,
East Street,
and The Garth.

Winkies Castle 

The village has a museum named Winkies Castle, dating back to the 17th century, which is run by volunteers and open to visitors from Easter Saturday each year until the end of September. This is not really a castle but an old half cruck cottage formerly owned by the late master shoemaker, Jack Anderson. There is a story that the house's name comes from Jack's cat named Winkie. The museum puts on rotating exhibitions and has over 6,000 items, including a two-headed lamb called "Bill and Ben".

The building was saved from demolition in 1968 by Jack Anderson when he turned it into a community museum and bequeathed it to the Community of Marske (trustees Redcar and Cleveland Borough Council).It is now run and managed by volunteers and is open three days a week from Easter Saturday until the end of September each year.

Transport 

Marske is served by Longbeck and Marske railway stations, which connect to Darlington railway station. The main road through Marske is the A1085 Coast Road and High Street.

Marske is served by the Arriva North East 4/4A, 64/64A, 81/81A/781, and X3/X4 bus services.

Education 

Marske-by-the-Sea has three primary schools: Errington Primary School, Westgarth Primary School, and St Bede's R.C. Primary School.
Marske is served by the following secondary schools: Outwood Academy Bydales located within the village and Rye Hills Academy, Sacred Heart Catholic Secondary located in Redcar, and Huntcliff School located in Saltburn.

Sport 

Marske-by-the-Sea has a Martial Art ITF Tae Kwon Do School.
Furthermore, the village has two Football teams; Northern League Division 1 football club Champions, Marske United F.C. and Langbaurgh League Division 2 Champions, Marske F.C.,
as well as a cricket club, and badminton club.

Notable people 

 England and Yorkshire cricketer Paul Jarvis grew up in Marske. His Yorkshire cc jumper can be found on display in Marske cricket club.
 Charles Dickens visited Marske in around 1844 to see the grave of Captain Cook's father. An early 20th century memorial, 20–30 yards west of St Germain's tower, marks the approximate location.
 'Captain' W. E. Johns, the author of the Biggles books, was based at RFC Marske towards the end of the First World War.
 Charlotte Hughes, the longest-lived person ever documented in the United Kingdom, lived in Marske.
 In the 1970s West Indies cricketer Albert Padmore lived in Marske.
 Artist Chris Dooks lived in Marske.
 Middlesbrough Football Club players, Robbie Stockdale and Cameron Park both grew up in Marske.
 Singer and songwriter Georgina Anderson, who died from cancer in 2013 at the age of 15, came from Marske and attended Bydales Secondary School.
 The electronic music group Radio Massacre International was formed in Marske in the early 1980s.
 Actor-playwright, singer-songwriter Shaun Lawton, was born in New Marske in 1941.
 Enid Scudamore-Stanhope, Countess of Chesterfield (10 September 1878 – 30 November 1957), heiress and racehorse breeder, was born at Marske Hall.

References

Further reading 

 Changing Marske-by-the-Sea, Winkies Castle Folk Museum.

External links 

 Schools: Bydales, Errington Primary, Westgarth Primary
 Local history: Our World
 Winkies Castle: Official website, Museums in Redcar & Cleveland webpage
 Historic photographs: Redcar & Cleveland Borough Council
 

Villages in North Yorkshire
Places in the Tees Valley
Redcar and Cleveland
Seaside resorts in England
Populated coastal places in Redcar and Cleveland